Konuklu is a village in the Besni District, Adıyaman Province, Turkey. Its population is 578 (2021).

The hamlets of Cakalı, Göndürme, İznik, Körosmanlı and Sarıçiçek are attached to the village.

References

Villages in Besni District